The women's 100 metres competition at the 2002 Asian Games in Busan, South Korea was held on 8 October at the Busan Asiad Main Stadium.

Schedule
All times are Korea Standard Time (UTC+09:00)

Records

Results

1st round 
 Qualification: First 3 in each heat (Q) and the next 2 fastest (q) advance to the final.

Heat 1 
 Wind: +0.6 m/s

Heat 2 
 Wind: +0.6 m/s

Final 
 Wind: −0.1 m/s

References

External links 
Results - Heats
Results - Final

Athletics at the 2002 Asian Games
2002